Isophya kraussii is a species of insect belonging to the family Tettigoniidae  subfamily Phaneropterinae. It is found in Poland, Germany, Austria, the Czech Republic, Slovakia, Slovenia, Croatia and Hungary. The species prefers bushy dry grasslands, forest edges and high-growing, slightly wet meadows. The imagines appear early in the year from about mid-June, but the majority are to be found from July.

References

Orthoptera of Europe
Insects described in 1878
Phaneropterinae